The 2011 Andalucia Tennis Experience was a tennis tournament played on outdoor clay courts. It was the 3rd edition of the Andalucia Tennis Experience, and an International-level tournament of the 2011 WTA Tour. The event took place at the Club de Tenis Puente Romano in Marbella, Spain, from April 2 through April 10, 2011.

The field was led by top seed Victoria Azarenka. She was joined by former world no. 1 Russian Dinara Safina and two-time Grand Slam champion Svetlana Kuznetsova. Defending champion Flavia Pennetta and finalist of the past two years Carla Suárez Navarro were also on set to join the field before they withdrew.

Prize money and points distribution

Points distribution

Prize money
The total commitment prize money for this year's event is US $220.000.

Entrants

Seeds

Rankings and seedings are as of March 21, 2011.

Other entrants
The following players received wildcards into the main draw:
 Dinara Safina
 Svetlana Kuznetsova
 Estrella Cabeza Candela

The following players received entry via qualifying:

 Mona Barthel
 Irina-Camelia Begu
 María-Teresa Torró-Flor
 Lara Arruabarrena-Vecino

Notable withdrawals
The following players withdrew from the tournament for various reasons:
 Flavia Pennetta (torn shoulder muscle)
 Ana Ivanovic (fatigue)
 Carla Suárez Navarro (right elbow surgery)

Champions

Singles

 Victoria Azarenka def.  Irina-Camelia Begu, 6–3, 6–2
 It was Azarenka's second title of the year and the seventh of her career.

Doubles

 Nuria Llagostera Vives /  Arantxa Parra Santonja def.  Sara Errani /   Roberta Vinci, 3–6, 6–4, [10–5]

References

External links
Official website

       
Andalucia
Andalucia Tennis Experience
Andalucia